Shahriari Rural District is in Doab Samsami District of Kuhrang County, Chaharmahal and Bakhtiari province, Iran. There were 507 inhabitants in 141 households at the National Census of 2011. At the most recent census of 2016, the population of the rural district was 1,374 in 430 households. The largest of its 37 villages was Bidamin, with 195 people.

References 

Kuhrang County

Rural Districts of Chaharmahal and Bakhtiari Province

Populated places in Chaharmahal and Bakhtiari Province

Populated places in Kuhrang County

fa:دهستان شهرياري